{{safesubst:#invoke:RfD|||month = March
|day = 18
|year = 2023
|time = 15:40
|timestamp = 20230318154001

|content=
REDIRECT Happy New_Year (song)

}}